Fabrício de Assis Costa da Silva (born July 24, 1990), better known as Fabrício Guerreiro, is a Brazilian mixed martial artist who is known to have competed in Bellator's Featherweight division. A professional competitor since 2009, Guerreiro was also a contestant on The Ultimate Fighter: Brazil.

Mixed martial arts career

Early career
Guerreiro started his professional career in 2009. Until 2012, he fought only in promotions within his home state of Amapá.

The Ultimate Fighter
In March 2012, Guerreiro was announced as a cast member of The Ultimate Fighter: Brazil.

Guerreiro was defeated by Rodrigo Damm during the entry round via submission due to a rear-naked choke in round two.

Bellator MMA
In November 2012, it was announced that Guerreiro had signed with Bellator.

Guerreiro made his debut against Magomedrasul Khasbulaev on February 7, 2013 at Bellator 88 in the quarterfinal match of Bellator season eight featherweight tournament. He lost via submission due to an arm-triangle choke in the second round.

Guerreiro faced Desmond Green on September 13, 2013 at Bellator 99 in the quarterfinal match of Bellator season nine featherweight tournament. He won via unanimous decision (29-28, 29-28, 29-28) and advanced to the semifinals.

Guerreiro then faced Patricio Freire in the semifinals on October 11, 2013 at Bellator 103. He lost the fight via unanimous decision (30-27, 30-27, 30-27).

Guerreiro faced Shahbulat Shamhalaev on May 17, 2014 at Bellator 120. He won the fight via submission due to a kimura in the first round.

Guerreiro was expected to face Nick Piedmont on January 16, 2015 at Bellator 132. However, Piedmont pulled out of the fight for an undisclosed reason. Guerreiro was removed from the fight card as a result. 

Guerreiro faced John Teixeira at Bellator 136 on April 10, 2015. He lost the fight by split decision.

Mixed martial arts record

|-
|Win
|align=center|22-5 (1)
|Ousmane Thomas Diagne
|TKO (punches)
|URCC 32 - Fury: Battle of the Islands
|
|align=center|3
|align=center|2:51
|San Mateo, California, United States
|
|-
|Loss
|align=center|21–5 (1)
|Efrain Escudero 
|Decision (unanimous)
|Conquer FC 3 
|
|align=center|3
|align=center|5:00
|Richmond, California, United States
|
|-
|Win
|align=center|21-4 (1)
|Will Chope
|Submission (armbar)
|URCC 29 - Conquest
|
|align=center|1
|align=center|1:43
|San Francisco, California, United States
|
|-
|Loss
|align=center|20–4 (1)
|John Macapá
|Decision (split)
|Bellator 136
|
|align=center|3
|align=center|5:00
|Irvine, California, United States
|
|-
|Win
|align=center|20–3 (1)
|Shahbulat Shamhalaev
|Submission (kimura)
|Bellator 120
|
|align=center|1
|align=center|3:29
|Southaven, Mississippi, United States
|
|-
|Loss
|align=center|19–3 (1)
|Patricio Freire 
|Decision (unanimous)
|Bellator 103
|
|align=center|3
|align=center|5:00
|Mulvane, Kansas, United States
|
|-
|Win
|align=center|19–2 (1)
|Desmond Green
|Decision (unanimous)
|Bellator 99
|
|align=center|3
|align=center|5:00
|Temecula, California, United States
|Bellator season 9 featherweight tournament quarterfinal.
|-
|Win
|align=center|18–2 (1)
|Alisson Rodrigues
|TKO (punches)
|WCC: W–Combat 17
|
|align=center|1
|align=center|N/A
|Macapá, Amapá, Brazil
|
|-
|Loss
|align=center|17–2 (1)
|Magomedrasul Khasbulaev
|Submission (arm-triangle choke)
|Bellator 88
|
|align=center|2
|align=center|1:15
|Duluth, Georgia, United States
|Bellator season 8 featherweight tournament quarterfinal.
|-
|Win
|align=center|17–1 (1)
|Átila Lourenço
|KO (punch)
|Equinócio Fight 2
|
|align=center|1
|align=center|2:09
|Macapá, Amapá, Brazil
|
|-
|Win
|align=center|16–1 (1)
|Roberto da Silva
|Submission (triangle choke)
|WCC: W–Combat 16
|
|align=center|1
|align=center|2:17
|Macapá, Amapá, Brazil
|
|-
|Win
|align=center|15–1 (1)
|João Paulo Santos
|TKO (punches)
|Equinócio Fight
|
|align=center|2
|align=center|0:22
|Macapá, Amapá, Brazil
|
|-
|Win
|align=center|14–1 (1)
|Marcinei Custódio 
|Submission (triangle choke)
|WCC: W–Combat 15
|
|align=center|1
|align=center|2:39
|Macapá, Amapá, Brazil
|
|-
|Win
|align=center|13–1 (1)
|Rafael Addario 
|Submission (arm-triangle choke)
|King Combat
|
|align=center|3
|align=center|4:20
|Macapá, Amapá, Brazil
|
|-
|Loss
|align=center|12–1 (1)
|Rafael Addario 
|TKO (punches)
|WCC: W–Combat 14
|
|align=center|1
|align=center|0:48
|Macapá, Amapá, Brazil
|
|-
|Win
|align=center|12–0 (1)
|Adson Lira 
|Submission (armbar)
|Iron Man Vale Tudo 22
|
|align=center|3
|align=center|4:20
|Macapá, Amapá, Brazil
|
|-
|Win
|align=center|11–0 (1)
|João Paulo Rodrigues
|TKO (punches)
|Ecofight 13
|
|align=center|2
|align=center|2:15
|Macapá, Amapá, Brazil
|
|-
|NC
|align=center|10–0 (1)
|Jadison Dimitry
|No contest
|Macapá Martial Arts
|
|align=center|N/A
|align=center|N/A
|Macapá, Amapá, Brazil
|
|-
|Win
|align=center|10–0
|Carlos Augusto
|Submission (rear-naked choke)
|Ultimate Finus Fighting 3
|
|align=center|3
|align=center|5:00
|Macapá, Amapá, Brazil
|
|-
|Win
|align=center|9–0
|Tiago Trator
|Submission (rear-naked choke)
|Ecofight 12
|
|align=center|3
|align=center|2:45
|Macapá, Amapá, Brazil
|
|-
|Win
|align=center|8–0
|Eliel dos Santos
|Decision (unanimous)
|Ecofight 12
|
|align=center|2
|align=center|5:00
|Macapá, Amapá, Brazil
|
|-
|Win
|align=center|7–0
|Glaucker Arrada
|Submission (armbar)
|Ultimate Finus Fighting 2
|
|align=center|1
|align=center|1:41
|Macapá, Amapá, Brazil
|
|-
|Win
|align=center|6–0
|Eliel dos Santos
|Submission (kimura)
|WCC: W–Combat 3
|
|align=center|1
|align=center|2:18
|Macapá, Amapá, Brazil
|
|-
|Win
|align=center|5–0
|Gilberto Pantoja
|Submission (kimura)
|WCC: W–Combat 3
|
|align=center|2
|align=center|3:35
|Macapá, Amapá, Brazil
|
|-
|Win
|align=center|4–0
|Jefferson Alves
|Submission (armbar)
|Ultimate Finus Fighting 1
|
|align=center|1
|align=center|2:28
|Macapá, Amapá, Brazil
|
|-
|Win
|align=center|3–0
|Renenson Costa
|Submission (keylock)
|WCC: W–Combat
|
|align=center|1
|align=center|4:10
|Macapá, Amapá, Brazil
|
|-
|Win
|align=center|2–0
|Hugo dos Santos
|Submission (kimura)
|MMA Evolution 3
|
|align=center|1
|align=center|4:00
|Macapá, Amapá, Brazil
|
|-
|Win
|align=center|1–0
|Antônio Carlos
|Submission (armbar)
|Gladiador Fight
|
|align=center|1
|align=center|1:49
|Macapá, Amapá, Brazil
|

Mixed martial arts exhibition record

|-
| Loss
| align=center| 0–1
| Rodrigo Damm
| Submission (rear-naked choke)
| The Ultimate Fighter: Brazil
|  (airdate)
| align=center| 2
| align=center| 0:00
| São Paulo, Brazil
|

References

1990 births
Living people
Sportspeople from Amapá
Brazilian male judoka
Brazilian male mixed martial artists
Featherweight mixed martial artists
Mixed martial artists utilizing judo